Sir Henry Monson, 3rd Baronet (17 September 1653 – 6 April 1718) of Burton Hall, Burton by Lincoln, Lincolnshire was an English politician. He was a Member of Parliament (MP) for Lincoln at various dates between 1675 and 1689.

He was the eldest surviving son of John Monson, MP for Lincoln, who predeceased his own father in 1674. Monson thus inherited the baronetcy from his grandfather Sir John Monson, 2nd Baronet in 1683.

He succeeded his father as MP for Lincoln in a by-election in 1675, sitting until 1679. He was re-elected to the seat in 1685, sitting until he was ejected in 1689 for being a non-juror (ie for not swearing allegiance to William III).

He died in 1718 and was buried at South Carlton. He had married Elizabeth, the daughter of Charles Cheyne, 1st Viscount Newhaven of Chesham Bois, Buckinghamshire. They had no children and so the baronetcy passed to his brother William.

References

1653 births
1718 deaths
Baronets in the Baronetage of England
Politics of Lincoln, England
English MPs 1661–1679
English MPs 1679
English MPs 1680–1681
English MPs 1685–1687
English MPs 1689–1690
Deputy Lieutenants of Lincolnshire